L'Estréchure is a commune in the Gard department in southern France.

Population

See also
Communes of the Gard department

References

External links

 Bienvenue à l'Estréchure

Communes of Gard